These are the list of results that England have played from 1947 to 1949.

1947 
Scores and results list England's points tally first.

1948 
Scores and results list England's points tally first.

1949 
Scores and results list England's points tally first.

Year Box 

1947–49
1946–47 in English rugby union
1947–48 in English rugby union
1948–49 in English rugby union